Nippulanti Manishi is a 1986 Indian Telugu-language action film written and directed by S. B. Chakravarthy. The film stars Nandamuri Balakrishna, Radha and Sarath Babu, with music composed by Chakravarthy. It is a remake of the Hindi film Qayamat (1983).

Plot 
The film begins with a justice-seeking ruffian Parasuram who uproars against anti-social elements and stands as a pillar for the destitute. Once he enrages by the news of returning a tycoon Raja from abroad and spins rearward. Parasuram is extremely darling Radha. Raja entices and aspires to subjugate her when Parasuram smacks him. As a result, the fiendish slays Radha on the stage of the turtle doves' wedding and is acquitted as non-guilty. Thus, Parasuram assigns to establish a new judiciary to control the system. Presently, he slaughters Raja for granted. Since Parasuram turns a diehard to law & order the department appoints a stout-hearted cop ACP Vijay to snare him. 

At that point, Vijay is startled to view the file as Parasuram is his childhood bestie by whose benefit, he acquired esteem. Now, the two contact and embrace when Parasuram proclaims that there is no chance of his retrieval. Plus, takes a word from Vijay not to yield his path for their friendship. Besides, Vijay apprehends a dangerous gangster Jakki with the aid of Parasuram when he animosities on both. Next, Parasuram's difference of opinion with a big shot Bhujanga Rao. So, he colludes with a prostitute Pankajam and incriminates him under the charge of molesting a girl Swapna when Vijay seizes him. Further, he creates a rift between the soulmates where Parasuram misconstrues Vijay that he betrayed him. As of today, Parasuram is penalized for 7 years when he pledges to reimburse all accountable to his moving point. 

Time passes, and Parasuram frees up and seeks vengeance. Consecutively, he tactically eliminates Bhujanga Rao & Pankajam leaving any piece of evidence. Soon, he approaches Vijay who is leading delightful life with his wife Lakshmi and sister Aasha one that resemblance of Radha. Parasuram shows a threat to Aasha who beset her to make Vijay's life a nightmare. Being conscious of it, Vijay onslaughts on Parasuram when they declare warfare. Parallelly, Vijay sends away Aasha for her safety when she is abducted by Jakki on behalf of Parasuram. Here, Vijay flares up strikes to attack. Anyhow, Aasha is safeguarded by Parasuram, though he makes various attempts to molest Aasha he backs recollecting his love for Radha. Then, Aasha discerns his virtue and endears him. Forthwith the gallants keep pace with face-to-face and battle erupts. In the interim, Jakki again hits Aasha when Parasuram rescues her. Spotting it, Vijay comprehends the eminence of Parasuram and mutually pleads for pardon. At last, Vijay offers Parasuram to accept Aasha’s hand which he does so. Finally, the movie ends on a happy note with the marriage of Parasuram & Aasha.

Cast 

Nandamuri Balakrishna as Parasuram
Radha as Radha & Aasha (Dual role)
Sarath Babu as Vijay
Nutan Prasad as Bhujanga Rao
Rajeev as Jacky
Raj Varma as Raja
Hema Sundar as Keshava
P. J. Sarma as IGP Ranga Rao
Suthi Velu as Dumbu & Lambu (Dual role)
K. K. Sarma as Govindaiah
Narra Venkateswara Rao as Masthan
Potti Prasad as Rangaiah
Bhimiswara Rao as Judge
Telephone Satyanarayana as Lawyer
Madan Mohan
Rajya Lakshmi as Lakshmi
Sri Lakshmi as Chukkamma
Varalakshmi as Mahalakshmi
Silk Smitha as item number
Anuradha as item number
Babita as item number
Sundari as Swapna
Y. Vijaya as Pankajam

Soundtrack 
Music composed by Chakravarthy. Lyrics were written by Veturi.

References

External links 
 

1980s Telugu-language films
1986 action films
1986 films
Films scored by K. Chakravarthy
Indian action films
Telugu remakes of Hindi films